Brian Corry (born 1995 in Sixmilebridge, County Clare) is an Irish sportsperson.  He plays hurling with his local club Sixmilebridge and with the Clare senior inter-county team.

Playing career

Club

Corry plays hurling with his local club in Sixmilebridge. He has enjoyed success with his club winning the Clare Senior Hurling Championship in 2013, 2015, 2017, 2019 and 2020.

Inter-county

Corry first came to prominence on the inter-county scene as a member of the Clare minor hurling team in 2012.   In 2018 Corry was included as a member of the Clare senior hurling panel.

References

1988 births
Living people
Ballymartle hurlers
Cork inter-county hurlers